The 1996–97 Ottawa Senators season was the fifth season of the Ottawa Senators of the National Hockey League (NHL). This season saw great improvement by the club, as the team finished out of last place in the National Hockey League (NHL) for the first time in team history, and went on to qualify for the 1997 Stanley Cup playoffs as the seventh seed in the Eastern Conference. In the playoffs, the Senators lost in the first round (Conference Quarterfinals) to the Buffalo Sabres. This was the first of eleven consecutive playoff appearances for the Senators.

Regular season
Ottawa got off to a slow start, with a 7–12–6 record in their first 25 games, but as the season would go on, the team got better, finishing with a .500 record in their remaining 57 games and earned 45 points in the last 41 games of the regular season. The Senators went 10–4–2 in their final 16 games of the season, including a 1–0 victory over the Buffalo Sabres in the final game of the season to earn a playoff berth.

Alexei Yashin and Daniel Alfredsson led the club offensively, while Ron Tugnutt and Damian Rhodes provided very solid goaltending for the team throughout the season.

Final standings

Schedule and results

Playoffs

The Ottawa Senators ended the 1996–97 regular season as the Eastern Conference's seventh seed. The Senators faced the Buffalo Sabres, and nearly pulled off the upset against their heavily favoured opponent, losing to the Sabres in overtime in the seventh game of the series, a game which included an own-goal by Alexei Yashin when the puck went past Tugnutt after the Sens won a faceoff in their zone.

Eastern Conference Quarterfinals: vs. (2) Buffalo Sabres
Buffalo wins series 4–3

Player statistics

Regular season
Scoring

Goaltending

Playoffs
Scoring

Goaltending

Awards and records
 Molson Cup - Alexei Yashin

Transactions

Trades

Waivers

No waiver transactions.

Free agents

Source:

Draft picks
Ottawa's draft picks at the 1996 NHL Entry Draft in St. Louis, Missouri.

Farm teams
 Worcester IceCats (American Hockey League)
 Raleigh IceCaps (East Coast Hockey League)

See also
1996–97 NHL season

References

''Total Hockey: "Ottawa Senators 1992–93 to Date" by Bruce Garrioch, 1998
Ottawa Senators Media Guide 2007
The Internet Hockey Database
National Hockey League Guide & Record Book 2007

Ottawa Senators seasons
Ottawa Senators season, 1996-97
Ottawa